John Ward (dates of birth and death unknown) was an English first-class cricketer. Ward bowled roundarm fast, although which arm Ward bowled with is unknown.

Ward represented Hampshire in a single first-class match in 1877 against Kent.

External links
John Ward at Cricinfo
John Ward at CricketArchive

English cricketers
Hampshire cricketers